Svatopluk Beneš (24 February 1918 – 27 April 2007) was a Czechoslovak film actor. He appeared in 90 films and television shows between 1934 and 2003.

Selected filmography
 Pacientka Dr. Hegla (1940)
 Pohádka máje (1940)
 Ladies in Waiting (1940)
 Nocturnal Butterfly (1941)
 I'll Be Right Over (1942)
 Spring Song (1944)
 Průlom (1946)
 A Kiss from the Stadium (1948)
 The Secret of Blood (1953)
 Komedianti (1954)
 The Good Soldier Schweik (1956)
 I Dutifully Report (1958)
 Zítra vstanu a opařím se čajem (1977)
 Unterwegs nach Atlantis (1982, TV series)

References

External links
 Svatopluk Beneš in Czech National Theater Archive
Svatopluk Beneš on Česko-Slovenská filmová databáze (Czechoslovak film database)
Svatopluk Beneš on Filmová databáze (Film database)

 

1918 births
2007 deaths
Czech male film actors
Czech male stage actors
Czech male television actors
People from Roudnice nad Labem
Burials at Olšany Cemetery
Recipients of the Thalia Award